The following highways are numbered 633:

Canada
Alberta Highway 633
Saskatchewan Highway 633

Ireland
R633 road (Ireland)

United States